Matija Škarabot (born 4 February 1988) is a Slovenian footballer who plays for ND Primorje as a left back.

International career
Škarabot made his first appearance for the Slovenia U21 on 11 February 2009, in a friendly match against Romania U21.

On 1 October 2010, Škarabot was summoned into a 23-man squad of the Slovenia national football team for the UEFA Euro 2012 qualifying matches against Faroe Islands and Estonia that took place on 8 October and 12 October 2010, respectively.

Personal life
Skarabot was in a relationship with Strictly Come Dancing star Nadiya Bychkova until 2021, with whom he has a daughter called Mila.

References

External links
PrvaLiga profile 

1988 births
Living people
People from Nova Gorica
Slovenian footballers
Association football fullbacks
Slovenia youth international footballers
Slovenia under-21 international footballers
ND Gorica players
Slovenian expatriate footballers
Belgian Pro League players
Expatriate footballers in Belgium
Slovenian expatriate sportspeople in Belgium
Slovenian PrvaLiga players
K.A.A. Gent players
Slovenian expatriate sportspeople in Croatia
Expatriate footballers in Croatia
Croatian Football League players
HNK Rijeka players
NK Olimpija Ljubljana (2005) players